Rekka is a 2016 Indian Tamil-language action comedy film written and directed by Rathina Shiva. The film features Vijay Sethupathi, Lakshmi Menon and Sija Rose in the lead roles, while Sathish, K. S. Ravikumar and Sriranjani play supporting roles. The film is produced by B. Ganesh, who co-produced Orange Mittai. Featuring music composed by D. Imman and cinematography by Dinesh B. Krishnan. The film which commenced production in January 2015 released on 7 October 2016 along with other Tamil movies, Remo and Devi. Upon release, the film received mixed reviews from critics.

Plot
Two dons, Cheliyan and David are enemies. Cheliyan kills David's brother so David swears to avenge his brother's death and waits for the right opportunity. Shiva is a youth from Kumbakonam who unites lovers and his family supports him. This brings him several troubles, one of which from David when Shiva stops David's marriage with a girl who refused to marry him. David wants to know who stopped his marriage and leaves the place without a word after seeing him. This worries his father, Ratnam as he fears that David might harm his son. Shiva hallucinates a woman who he calls Mala, who asks him 'Why did you do like this?' and he replies that he will correct everything. He is having a trouble for a reason and his family consoles him. Shiva's sister is getting married and Shiva ensures that no trouble comes in the marriage. However, on the day before marriage, Shiva had to face a critical situation through David who threatens to stop his sister's marriage like how Shiva stopped his marriage. Shiva begs David and tells him that he is ready to do anything for him in return of letting his sister's marriage happen without any problem. David demands him to abduct a woman from Madurai, who is the daughter of Minister Manivasagam, an influential politician Madurai. Shiva agrees and leaves for Madurai missing his sister's wedding.

At Madurai, he finds Bharati, the fiancée of Cheliyan, who David want him to abduct. Shiva intends to take a selfie with her and make David believe that he abducted her but things turn in an unexpected way when Bharati announces everyone including her family that she is going to elope with Shiva, getting everyone to think he is her boyfriend. Manivasagam's men try to stop them, but they fly away to Coimbatore, the headquarters of Cheliyan. Shiva ensures that his sister's marriage happens without any problems and gets updates from his friend, Keerai. At Coimbatore, Bharati waits for Shiva to propose her but Shiva is confused about why she eloped with him. David reaches Coimbatore and challenges Cheliyan that he abducted Bharati. Cheliyan rushes to the mall he owns where Shiva and Bharathi are having coffee time. Bharati encourages him to propose her, but in turn, Shiva tells about his childhood love.

Shiva during his 6th standard was in love with a girl named Mala, his tuition teacher who is very much elder to him. All the men in the town fall in love with her including a newly graduated doctor, Selvam. Mala reciprocates his love as well though they don't declare their love to each other. Shiva misunderstands his love for Mala, but Mala tells him that he loves him as her brother. Mala's father cheats people with fraud chit funds and demands Mala to vacate the town failing on which he threatens her that he will commit suicide. Mala writes a letter to Selvam and asks Shiva to deliver it to him. However, on the way, Shiva's friends tempt him to watch a movie. The next morning, Selvam is shocked to know that Mala left the town without leaving any message. People who were deceived by Mala's father demand money from Selvam and they thrash Selvam's father leading to his death. Selvam turns insane out of shock. Shiva understands that the letter which he failed to deliver to Selvam is the reason behind his insanity. He is not able to recover from guilt and that is why he hallucinates Mala. To overcome his guilt, he starts to help lovers to get united. Bharati also reveals why she eloped with Shiva.

Bharati met Shiva during an 80th birthday marriage event of an elderly couple which was organised by Shiva. She was attracted by the fact that his family is supporting him for his acts and every one of them talks very good about him. She was waiting for a right time to meet him, but destiny brought him to her. She declares her love for him and Shiva is shocked. David calls Shiva, tells him to leave her, and vacate the place. When Shiva resists, he threatens to kill Ratnam. Out of guilt once again, he leaves the place. Things take a turn when Mala meets him in a situation where several goons chase her. She requests to take her to the police station. Shiva reveals himself and he saves Mala from the goons. David forcibly takes Bharati with him and takes her to Cheliyan. David and Cheliyan come face to face to kill each other. Shiva interrupts and takes Bharati with him. Cheliyan tries to stop them, but David interrupts Cheliyan to avenge. After a series of fights, Shiva takes Bharati with him to his place Kumbakonam along with Mala. Back in Coimbatore, Cheliyan and David try to get rid of each other. In Kumbakonam, Shiva unites Mala with Selvam. Shiva tears off the letter which he failed to deliver to Selvam years ago without reading what has been written in it.

Now Shiva has to face Manivasagam and his men to win the love between him and Bharati.

Cast

 Vijay Sethupathi as Shiva
 Lakshmi Menon as Bharathi
 Sija Rose as Mala
 Kabir Duhan Singh as Chezhiyan
 Harish Uthaman as David
 Kishore as Selvam
 Sathish as Keerai
 K. S. Ravikumar as Ratnam, Shiva's father
 Sriranjani as Shiva's mother
 Meera Krishnan as Bharathi's mother 
 Shalu Shamu as Bharathi's friend
 Master Raghavan as Young Shiva
 Master Hariharan as Young Keerai
 KSG Venkatesh as Mala's father
 Babu G as Manivasagam, Bharathi's father
 Soundararaja
 Supergood Subramani as David's henchman
 TSR

Production
The film began production in January 2016, with actress Lakshmi Menon announced as a lead. Harish Uthaman is said to be playing an important role. Kabir Duhan Singh who played the antagonist in Vedhalam will also be playing in this film. The official pooja ceremony took place at the famous AVM studios in Chennai on 6 May 2016. Set against the backdrop of Madurai and Kumbakonam. The film is stated to be on the lines of ilayathalapathy Vijay's previous movie Ghilli. The film is touted to be a commercial entertainer Vijay Sethupathi portrays the role of an advocate, due to some circumstances he is forced to kidnap a girl. Despite Vijay Sethupathi who suffered leg injury during K.V.Anand film, the team shot a romantic song in Bangkok. The team also shot a car chase stunt sequence which was shot in the basement car parking area of Ramee Mall, in Teynampet, Chennai. It is stated to be the climax portion.

Release
The film was released on 7 October 2016, clashing alongside Sivakarthikeyan's Remo and Prabhu Deva's Devi (L) The TN theatrical rights of Rekka were sold to a new production house named, Sivabalan Pictures for a huge price becoming a record for Vijay Sethupathi.

Music 

All songs composed by D. Imman.

See also
Seeru (2019)

References

External links

2016 films
Films scored by D. Imman
Indian action films
2016 masala films
Films shot in Madurai
Films shot in Bangkok
2010s Tamil-language films
2016 action films